Injera is a sour fermented pancake-like flatbread with a slightly spongy texture, traditionally made of teff flour. In Ethiopia, Eritrea, and some parts of Sudan, injera is the staple. Injera is central to the dining process, like bread or rice elsewhere.

Ingredients 

Traditionally, injera is made with just two ingredients – teff flour and water. Teff flour is ground from the grains of Eragrostis tef, also known as teff, an ancient cereal crop from the Ethiopian Highlands. Teff production is limited to certain middle elevations with adequate rainfall, and, as it is a low-yield crop, it is relatively expensive for the average farming household. As many farmers in the Ethiopian highlands grow their own subsistence grains, wheat, barley, corn, or rice flour are sometimes used to replace some or all of the teff content. Teff seeds are graded according to color, used to make different kinds of injera: nech (white), key or quey (red), and sergegna (mixed). When teff is not available, usually because of location or financial limitations, injera is made by fermenting a variety of different grains, including barley, millet, and sorghum. Teff is, however, the preferred grain for making injera, primarily because of its sensory attributes (color, smell, taste). Teff flour is gluten-free.

Preparation

To make injera, teff flour is mixed with water. The fermentation process is started by adding ersho, a clear, yellow liquid that accumulates on the surface of fermenting teff flour batter and is collected from previous fermentations. Ersho contains (aerobic) Bacillus species and several yeasts (in order of abundance): Candida milleri, Rhodotorula mucilaginosa, Kluyveromyces marxianus, Pichia naganishii and Debaromyces hansenii. The mixture is then allowed to ferment for an average of two to three days, giving it a mildly sour taste.

Making

Baking method
The baking method for injera has changed little since its origin. Traditionally, the flour is mixed with water and fermented. It is baked by pouring the mixture onto a large circular griddle, known as a mitad. 

The injera is baked into large, flat and round pieces. The dough's viscosity allows it to be poured onto the baking surface, rather than rolled out.

In terms of shape, injera compares to the French crêpe and the Indian dosa as a flatbread cooked in a circle and used as a base for other foods. In taste and texture, it is more similar to the South Indian appam. The bottom surface of the injera, which touches the heating surface, has a relatively smooth texture, while the top is porous. This porous texture makes injera good for scooping up sauces and dishes.

Baking surface
Baking is done on a circular griddle—either a large black clay plate over a fire or a specialized electric stove. Mitads have been found at archaeological sites dating back as far as 600 AD. Nowadays, mitads are no longer always made out of clay, and can also be electric.

Traditional clay stoves can be inefficient in that they consume large amounts of firewood and produce a lot of smoke, creating household pollution and making them dangerous to use around children. In 2003, an Eritrean research group designed a stove for cooking injera and other foods that uses more easily available fuel, such as twigs instead of large branches, crop residues and dung, locally called kubet. Several parts of this new stove are made in the central cities of Ethiopia and Eritrea, while other parts are moulded from clay by women in local areas.

Many women in urban areas—especially those living outside Ethiopia and Eritrea—now use electric injera stoves, which are topped with a large metal plate, or simply non-stick frying pans.

Consumption and contemporary use

In Ethiopia and Eritrea, a variety of stews, salads (during Ethiopian Orthodox fasting, for which believers abstain from most animal products), and more injera (called injera firfir) are placed on the injera for serving. Using one's hand (traditionally only the right one), small pieces of injera are torn and used to grasp the stews and salads for eating. The injera under these stews soaks up the juices and flavors of the foods, and after the stews and salads are gone, this bread is also consumed. Injera is thus simultaneously a food, eating utensil, and plate. When the entire "tablecloth" of injera is gone, the meal is over.

In Ethiopia and Eritrea, injera is eaten daily in virtually every household. Outside of Ethiopia and Eritrea, injera may be found in grocery stores and restaurants specializing in Ethiopian and Eritrean cooking.

Injera is the most important component of food in Ethiopia and Eritrea. It is often both the serving platter and utensil for a meal. Hearty stews such as wat are placed on top of the bread and then the meal is eaten by tearing pieces of injera off and scooping up the stews. While injera's literal use as the base and staple of any Ethiopian and Eritrean meal has not changed since its creation, its symbolic value has changed. Different varieties of injera can be found in the highlands versus the lowlands of Ethiopia. In the lowlands, injera is often made with sorghum and in the highlands it is more commonly made with barley. Either way, because it is made with something other than teff, its symbolic value has already decreased compared to the symbolic value of injera made with teff. There are symbolic value differences with types of teff as well. White-grained teff is more expensive to buy and thus symbolizes a higher status than its cheaper counterpart, red-grained teff.

Outside Ethiopia and Eritrea
There are similar variants to injera in other African countries, namely Sudan and Chad. The variant eaten in South Sudan, Sudan and Chad is known as kisra.

United States

Injera became more common in the United States during a spike in Ethiopian immigration in the 1980s and 1990s, largely because of the Refugee Act passed in 1980. Teff flour is now being produced in the United States by the Teff Company in Idaho, making teff more accessible to expatriate Ethiopians.

See also

 List of Ethiopian dishes and foods
 Eritrean cuisine
 Baghrir
 Lahoh
 Sudanese cuisine
 List of African dishes

References

Further reading
 The Deep Dish on Chicago Ethiopian Companion website to Kloman's book Mesob Across America 
 Traditional Ethiopian Injera Recipe 
 Here, Eat This: A Beginner's Guide to Ethiopian Food A Houston Press article that outlines all the basics for Ethiopian cuisine   
 
 de Solier, Isabelle. Food and the Self: Consumption, Production, and Material Culture. Bloomsbury Academic. 2013

External links
 Mesob Across America: Ethiopian Food in the U.S.A. A book about the history and culture of Ethiopian cuisine

Eritrean cuisine
Ethiopian cuisine
Fermented foods
Flatbreads
Pancakes
Somali cuisine
Sourdough breads
National dishes
Ethiopian-American history